Ansia Camuanga Correia is an Angolan politician for the MPLA and a member of the National Assembly of Angola.

References

Living people
Members of the National Assembly (Angola)
Year of birth missing (living people)
MPLA politicians
21st-century Angolan women politicians
21st-century Angolan politicians
Place of birth missing (living people)